Gajur Dëralla was captain of the Luboten Battalion. The Luboten Battalion was a military division of the Balli Kombëtar which operated in Albania under Fascist Italy and Nazi Germany.

Biography

Early life
Dëralla was born in Kalkandelen in 1909. Gajur was the son of Albanian patriot Mehmet Pashë Dërralla and brother of Halim Dëralla, involved in Albania's independence movement, and Hysen Dëralla, who would become a Major of the Luboten Battalion. Dëralla studied at the Yugoslav Military Academy. During his years at the military academy, Dëralla came into contact with Italian intelligence agency, OVRA. Deralla left the Kingdom of Yugoslavia and fled to Albania. In Albania, Dëralla enlisted as a regular soldier in the Royal Albanian Army. On April 12, 1939, Italy occupied Albania. After the Italian occupation of Albania, Deralla became an Officer in the Royal Italian Army.

Return to Tetovo
In 1941, Italian forces occupied Vardar Banovina. Dëralla returned to Tetovo, where he joined the Luboten Battalion as a Captain. The Battalion was responsible for securing the region from resistance groups, i.e. Yugoslav partisans. With the capitulation of Italy in 1943, Nazi Germany took control of the region.

Balli Kombëtar
Despite the Luboten Battalion being formed by the Italian forces, The Germans did not disband the battalion. Instead, the Luboten Battalion was incorporated into the Balli Kombëtar, strengthening its forces. The troops under Dëralla successfully repelled the Yugoslav partisans in Tetovo. Tetovo had the largest Balli Kombëtar base in Macedonia and was the centre of the Ballist movement in the region.

Death
At the end of 1943, the Luboten division was sent to Kičevo to help the Ballist (Balli Kombëtar) forces of Mefail Shehu against the Yugoslav partisans. The Luboten Battalion, augmented by additional troops from the Balli Kombëtar, to attack and dislodge partisan units fighting in Kicevo. En route to Kicevo, Petar Brajovic's partisan forces organised an ambush at Bukovici. When Dëralla and his forces went through Bukovici, the partisans successfully ambushed the battalion resulting in the death of Dëralla and his troops.

Notes

References

Albanian anti-communists
Albanian collaborators with Fascist Italy
Albanian collaborators with Nazi Germany
Albanian people of World War II
Albanian military personnel
1943 deaths
1909 births
Balli Kombëtar
People from Tetovo
20th-century Albanian people
20th-century Albanian military personnel
Albanians in North Macedonia
Deaths by firearm in Albania